This is a list of goddesses, deities regarded as female or mostly feminine in gender.

African mythology (sub-Saharan)

Afro-Asiatic
Ethiopian
Dhat-Badan
Kafa
Atete

Niger-Congo
Akan (inc. Ashanti)
Asase Ya (Asaase Afua, Asaase Yaa, Asase Yaa)
Ambundu
Kianda
Kuanja
Baganda
Nagadya
Nagawonyi
Edo (Bini)
Emotan
Fon (Dahomey)
Ayaba
Gleti
Mawu
Nana Buluku
Ga-Adangbe
Akonadi
Ashiakle
Igbo
Ahia Njoku
Ala
Ngombe
Mbokomu
Nyoro
Kaikara
Lubanga
Mulindwa
Shona
Dzivaguru
Woyo
Bunzi
Yoruba
Aja (Aje)
Ayao
Egungun-oya
Iyami Aje
Oba
Olokun
Orisa Oluwa
Oshun
Oya (Ọya-Iyansan)
Queen Oronsen
Velekete
Yemoja
Zulu
Inkosikazi
iNyanga
Mamlambo
Mbaba Mwana Waresa (Nomkhubulwane)
Nomhoyi
Usiququmadevu

Nilo-Saharan
Dinka
Abuk
Kalenjin (inc. Pokot)
Arawa
Seta
Topoh
Maasai
Olapa
Nambi
Nuer
Buk (Acol)
Shilluk
Diang
Nayakaya
Songhay
Isa (Issa)

Afro-American mythology

Afro-Brazilian
Candomblé
Ayao
Iansã (Iyá Mésàn, Oiá)
Nanã (Nana Burukú)
Yemanjá (Iemanjá)
Umbanda
Iansã
Iemanjá
Nanã 
Oxúm

Santeria
Yemayá

Vodou
Mami Wata
Mawu
Yemoja
Dominican (21 Divisions)
Anaisa Pye (Anaisa La Chiquita, Anaisa Pie, Anaisa Pie Danto)
Filomena
Metresili
Haitian
Adjassou-Linguetor
Ayida-Weddo (Aida-Weddo, Aido Hwedo, Aido Quedo, Ayida-Wedo, Aido Quedo)
Ayizan
Erzulie (Erzili, Ezili)
La Baliene
La Sirène
Mademoiselle Charlotte
Maîtresse Délai
Maîtresse Hounon'gon
Maman Brigitte (Gran Brigitte, Grann Brigitte, Maman Brijit, Manman, Manman Brigit)
Marinette (Marinette Bras Cheche, Marinette Pied Cheche)

Albanian mythology
E Bukura e Dheut
Prende (Zonja e Bukuris)

Arabian mythology (pre-Islamic)
Al-Lat (Alilat, Allat)
Al-‘Uzzá
Manaf
Manāt
Nā'ila
Nuha
Shams
Suwa'
Nabataean
Chaabou (Kaabu)
Sabaean
Dhat-Badan

Armenian mythology
Anahit (Anaitis)
Astghik (Astɫik)
Bagmasti
Nane (Hane, Hanea, Nana, Nanai)
Saris
Spandaramet (Sandaramet)
Tsovinar (Nar)

Urartian
Arubani
Bagvarti (Bagbartu, Bagmashtu, Bagparti)
Huba
Selardi
Tushpuea

Australian Aboriginal mythology
Anjea
Eingana
Kunapipi
Wala
Wuriupranili
Adnyamathanha
Bila
Gamilaraay
Birrahgnooloo
Yhi
Karajarri
Dilga
Wotjobaluk
Gnowee
Wurundjeri
Karatgurk
Yolngu
Djanggawul
Julunggul

Baltic mythology

Percunatele
Latvian

Bangu māte
Cela māte
Darzamāte
Dēkla (Dēkla māte)
Gausu māte
Jūras māte
Kapu māte
Kārta (Kārta māte)
Krumu māte
Laima
Lapu māte
Lauka māte
Lauku māte
Lauma
Lazdu māte
Lietus māte
Linu māte
Lopes māte
Lopu māte
Māra (Lopu Marija, Lopu māte, Māre, Mārīte, Mārša, Māršava, Piena māte)
Mēness
Meza māte
Mieza māte
Miglas māte
Pirta māte
Saule
Senu māte
Smilšu māte
Sniega māte
Tirgus māte
Ūdens māte
Upes māte
Veja māte
Veļu māte
Zemes māte
Ziedu māte
Ziemala mamulina
Lithuanian
Alabatis 
Audėja
Aušra
Aušrinė
Austėja
Bezelea
Birutė
Budtė
Dalia
Dugnė
Gabija (Moterų Gabija, Pelenų Gabija)
Gabjauja
Gadintoja
Giltinė (Kaulinyčia, Maras, Pavietrė)
Gondu 
Indraja
Išskalbėja 
Junda
Krūminė 
Kruonis
Lada
Laima
Laimė
Laumė
Lazdona
Lietuva
Luobo gelda (Lajbegelda)
Medeina (Medziojna, Žvoruna)
Mėnuo
Mėšlų boba
Metančioji
Milda
Mokienė
Morė
Neris
Nijolė
Nukirpėja 
Pajauta
Perkūnaitėlė
Pergrubė
Pilvytė
Praurimė

Ragutiene Pati
Rasa
Ratainyčia
Saulė
Sėlija 
Sergėtoja
Upinė
Užsparinė
Vaivora 
Vakarinė (Brėkšta, Vakarė)
Valginė 
Veliuona
Verpiančioji (Verpėja)
Žemės Motina
Žemyna
Žiezdrė
Old Prussian
Laima
Saule
Semine

Basque mythology
Aide
Ekhi
Ilargi
Lurbira
Mari

Berber mythology
Afri (Afrika)
Lamia
Libya
Nanna Tala
Shaheded
Tanit
Tinjis
Bimbache
Moneiba
Guanche
Chaxiraxi
Magec

Buddhism
(for Japanese Buddhist and syncretic deities, check #Japanese)

Mahayana
Ajaya
Citrasena
Dhanada
Dhupatara
Dhvajagrakeyura
Dipatara
Durjaya
Gandha Tara
Grahamatrka
Guanyin
Hariti
Janguli
Jayatara
Jnanadakini
Kaladuti
Kamini
Kapalini
Karini
Kesini
Kṣitigarbha
Kulisesvari
Tara (Arya Tara)

Vajrayana
Adhimukticarya
Bhumis
Abhimukhi
Acala
Arcismati
Dharmamegha
Durumgama
Prabhakari
Pramudita
Sadhumati
Sudurjaya
Vimala
Buddhalocana (Buddhalochana)
Chinnamunda
Ekajati
Grdhrasya
Jnanaparamita
Kakasya
Kotisri
Pratisamvits
Arthapratisamvit
Dharmapratisamvit
Tara (Arya Tara)
Vasitas
Adhimuktivasita
Ayurvasita
Buddhabodhiprabhavasita
Cittavasita
Dharmavasita
Jnanavasita
Karmavasita

Tibetan
Adidharma
Achi Chokyi Drolma
Bhrkuti-Tara
Cauri
Chenrézik
Cunda
Dhupa
Digambara
Dipa
Düza Minkar
Gandha
Gita
Khen-Ma
Kurukullā (Rigbyedma)
Jetsun Dölma
Mandarava
Nairatmya
Palden Lhamo
Samding Dorje Phagmo
Tenma goddesses
Töngyi Gyalmo (Hemantadevi)
Tummo (Caṇḍālī)
Yeshe Tsogyal

temporarily unsorted
Kumari
Lakshmi
Marici
Narodakini
Prajnaparamita
Samantabhadrī
Sitatapatra
Usnisavijaya
Vajrayogini
Vasudhara
Yakshini

Burmese mythology
Anauk Mibaya
Bago Medaw
Hnamadawgyi
Htibyuhsaung Medaw
Kwan Yin Medaw
Ma Ngwe Taung
Medaw Shwezaga
Mya Nan Nwe
Myaukhpet Shinma
Popa Medaw
Shin Nemi
Shingon
Shingwa
Shwe Nabay
Thonbanhla
Wathondara (Wathondare)

Cambodian mythology
Preah Mae Kong Si Im
Preah Mae Thoroni

Celtic mythology

British
Agrona
Alaisiagae
Beda
Boudihillia
Ancasta
Andraste (Andrasta)
Arnemetia
Brigantia
Britannia
Clota
Coventina
Epona
Iouga
Korrigan
Latis
Ricagambeda
Satiada
Senuna
Suleviae
Sulis
Verbeia

Cantabrian
Epane
Mater Deva

Gallaecian
Bandua
Hamavehae
Nabia

Gaulish
Abnoba
Acionna
Adsullata
Ancamna
Andarta
Annea Clivana
Arduinna
Artio
Aveta
Belenus (Belenos, Belinus, Bel, Beli Mawr)
Bergusia
Bormana
Bricta
Brigantia
Cathubodua
Damona
Dea Matrona
Divona
Epona
Erecura
Esus
Gontia
Ianuaria
Icauna
Icovellauna
Inciona
Matronae Aufaniae
Nantosuelta
Naria
Nemetona
Onuava
Ritona
Rosmerta
Sequana
Sirona
Souconna
Suleviae
Xulsigiae

Irish
Fir Bolg
Gaillimh inion Breasail
Tailtiu (Tailte)
Fomhoraigh
Cethlenn (Cethleann)
Ethniu (Eithne)
gairthear Mílidh Easpáinne
Aimend
Medb (Méabh, Meaḋḃ, Meadhbh)
Medb Lethderg
Mongfind (Mongfhionn)
Mór Muman (Mór Mhumhan, Mór Mumain)
Tlachtga
Tuatha de Danann
Áine
Airmed (Airmid)
Anu (Ana, Anand, Anann)
Banba (Banbha)
Bé Chuille (Bé Chuma, Becuille)
Beag (Bec)
Bébinn (Bébhinn)
Boann (Boand, Bóinn)
Brigid (Brig, Brigit)
Clíodhna (Clídna, Clíodna, Clíona, Clionadh)
Danu (Dana)
Ériu (Éire)
Ernmas
Étaín (Éadaoin, Édaín)
Fand (Fann)
Flidais (Flidas, Fliodhais, Fliodhas)
Fódla (Fódhla, Fóla, Fótla)
Fuamnach
Lí Ban
The Morrígan
Badb (Badb Catha, Badhbh)
Macha
Nemain

Scottish
Beira
Cailleach (Cailleach Bheur)
Momu
Scáthach

Welsh
Arianrhod
Branwen
Ceridwen
Creiddylad
Creirwy
Cyhyraeth
Cymidei Cymeinfoll
Dôn
Modron
Penarddun
Rhiannon

Cham mythology
Pajau Yan
Po Yan Dari
Yan Po Nagar

Dardic - Nuristani mythology
Kalasha
Charmo Vetr
Dizane (Dezalik, Disni, Ḍizálik)
Jestak (Jēṣṭak)
Krumai
Saranji
Nuristani
(formerly "Kafir")
Disani
Lunang
Nirmali
Prakde
Kshumai (Kime)
Zhiwud

East Asian mythology

Ainu
Hasinaw-uk-kamuy (Isosange Mat, Kamuy Paseguru)
Kamuy-huci (Apemerukoyan-mat Unamerukoyan-mat, Iresu Kamuy)
Kanna Kamuy
Kenas-unarpe
Tokapcup-kamuy 
Waka-ush Kamuy (Petorush Mat)
Yushkep Kamuy (Ashketanne Mat)

Chinese
Bai Mudan
Canmu (Cangu, Cangu Nainai, Leizu, Xi Lingshi)
Chang'e
Changxi
Chuangmu
Daji
Doumu 
Feng popo
Guanyin (Gun Yam, Gwun Yam, Kuan Im, Kuan Se Im, Kun Lam, Kwun Yam)
He Xiangu 
Houtu 
Hua Mulan
Huang Daopo
Jiang Yuan
Jingwei
Jiutian Xuannü
Lan Caihe
Leizi (Dianmu, Jinguang Shengmu)
Li Ye (Li Jilan)
Longmu
Longnü 
Magu
Mazu 
Meng Jian Nü
Meng Po
Mu Guiying
Nüba (Ba)
Nüwa 
Pan Jinlian
Qin Liangyu
Qiu Jin
Shuimu 
Shuiwei Shengniang
Songzi Niangniang 
Sun Bu'er
Wei Huacun
Wusheng Laomu 
Xi Shi 
Xian Furen (Lingnan Shengmu)
Xiangshuishen
E Huang
Nu Ying
Xihe
Xiwangmu (Jinmu Yuanjun, Wangmu Niangniang, Yaochi Jinmu)
Yu Xuanji
Zhinü
Zhunti (Zhuntu Fomu, Zhunti Pusa)

Japanese

Shinto
(inc. creation, Takamagahara, Izumo, Hyuga, etc.)
Akaru-hime (Himekosho-no-kami, Himekosho-no-yashiro-no-kami, Shitateru-hime)
Akinagatarashi-hime
Amaterasu (Amaterasu-ōmikami, Ōhirume-no-muchi-no-kami, Shinmei, Tenshō-daijin, Tenshō-kodaijin)
Amanozako
Ame-no-Mikumari-no-kami
Ame-no-Toyotarashikara-hime
Ame-no-Uzume (Okame, Otafuku)
Ayakashikone
Haniyasu-hime
Hayaakitsu-hime
Ichikishima-hime (Sayori-hime)
Ikutamayori-hime
Inari Ōkami 
Inazuma (Ina-bikari, Ina-tsurubi)
Isukeyori-hime
Iwanaga-hime
Iwatsu-hime
Izanami
Izuna-hime-no-mikoto
Kamimusubi (Kamumusubi)
Kamuōichi-hime (Ōtoshimioya-no-kami, Ōtoshimioya-no-mikoto)
Kamuyatate-hime
Kanayama-hime
Kayanarumi
Kayano-hime (Nozuchi-no-kami)
Kisagai-hime
Konohanasakuya-hime
Kukuri-hime
Kushinada-hime
Mihotsu-hime
Mizokui (Mizokuimimi)
Nakisawame
Niutsu-hime
Okinagatarashi-hime (Otarashi-hime)
Orihime (Ame-no-tanabata-hime, Asagao-hime, Ito-ori-hime, Me-Tanabata-sama, Momoko-hime, Sasagani-hime, Takimono-hime, Tanabata-tsume)
Otogisa-hime (Wakasa-hime)
Ōtomadoime
Ōtonobe (Ōtomabe)
Ōyatsuhime
Saho-hime
Seyatatara-hime
Shitateru-hime (Taka-hime, Wakakunitama)
Suseri-hime
Tagitsu-hime
Tagori-hime (Tagiri-hime)
Tamakushi-hime (Tamagushi-hime)
Tamayori-hime
Tatsuta-hime
Toyotama-hime
Toyouke-hime
Tsubura-hime
Tsumatsu-hime
Ugajin
Ukemochi (Ōgetsu-hime)
Umugai-hime
Wakahirume
Yorozuhata-hime (Honotohata-hime Kochiji-hime, Takuhatachiji-hime)

Buddhist - Mahayana
(inc. Nichiren, Pure Land, Tendai)
Gigeiten
Kannon (Kan'on, Kanzeon, Kwannon)
Kishimojin
Marishiten
Shichimen-daimyojin
Tara-bosatsu
Toshikami (Shoōgatsu-sama, Toshitokujin)
Uga Benzaiten

Buddhist - Vajrayana
(inc. Shingon)
Butsugen
Butsumo
Dakiniten
Marishiten
Tara-bosatsu

Seven Lucky Gods
Benzaiten (Benten-sama)
Daikokutennyo
Kisshōten (Kichijōten)
Kokuanten

Folk deities and spirits (yōkai, yūrei etc.)
Amazake-babaa

Ryukyu
Amamikyu
temporarily unsorted
Seiōbo

Korean
Bagiwang
Bari Gongju
Cheuksin
Chilseongsin
Eopsin
Gameunjang
Gaxi Sonnim
Gwan-eum (Gwanse-eum)
Jeoseung Halmang
Jijang
Jowangsin
Jungsegyeong (Jacheongbi)
Mago, the Great Mother and the Creatrix
Magu (deity)
Myeongwol
Oneuli
Samsin Halmoni (Samseung Halmang)
Seonangsin
Seowangmo
Solmundae Halmang
Sosamsin
Teojusin (Jisin)
Ungnyeo
Wongang Ami
Yeongdeung
Yuhwa

Mongol
Buryat
Aba-Khatun
Almoshi
Budraganá
Budung Yihé Ibi
Búlai
Deleyte-Sagan-Khatun
Ehé Tazar
Ehé Ureng Ibi
Qazagar
Sakhala-Khatun
Sanqaliń Qatĕń
Syt-kul-amine
Mongolian
Bilig-un cinadu kijaghar-a kuruksen
Hotogov Mailgan
Isa
Kele-yin ükin tengri
Nachigai (Etugen)
Yal-un eke
Teleglen-Edzen

Taiwanese aboriginal

 Alovai
 Ina
 
 Sauliyau
 
 
 Teposuruyan
 Tsinatsinau

 Sinan maharek
 Sinan maniray

 

 Telanke

Egyptian mythology
Ahti
Amathaunta
Ament (Amentet)
Ảmi-khent-āat 
Ảmi-pet-seshem-neterit
Ảmi-urt 
Ảmi-utchat-sảakhu-Ảtemt 
Ảmit-Qeţem 
Ảmit-she-t-urt 
Ammit (Ahemait, Ammut)
Amn
Amunet (Amaunet)
Anat (Anant, Anit, Anti, Antit)
Anhefta
Anput (Anuput, Inpewt, Input, Yineput)
Anqet
Anta
Antd
Anuke
Anuket (Anaka, Anqet, Anukis)
Apet
Āpertra 
Ảrit-ȧakhu 
Ảriti
Arsinoe II
Astarte
Ausaas
Ba-khati 
Ba'alat Gebal
Baiut-s-ảmiu-heh 
Bastet (Ailuros, Baast, Baset, Bast, B'sst, Ubaste)
Bat
Besna
Esna
Eye of Ra (Hetepes-Sekhus)
Hauhet
Hathor
Hatmehit (Hatmehyt, Hawit-Mahuyat)
Ḥebit 
Hedetet (Hedjedjet)
Hemsut (Hemuset)
Heptet
Heqet (Heket, Heqtit)
Heret-Kau (Heret)
Hert-ketit-s
Hert-Nemmat-Set
Hert-sefu-s
Heru-pa-kaut
Hesat
Heset
Hetemit
Horea
Ḥunit 
Ḥunit Pe
Ḥunit urit
Ḥuntheth 
Ḥurit urit
Iabet (Ab, Abet, Abtet, Iab, Iabtet)
Iat 
Imentet (Ament, Amentet, Imentit)
Ipy
Isis (Aset, Ese, Eset)
Iunit
Iusaaset (Iusaas, Saosis)
Iw
Kauket
Kebechet (Kabechet, Kabehchet, Kebehut, Kebehwet, Khebhut, Qebehut)
Ken
Khefthernebes
Khensit (Chensit)
Maa-ā
Maa-neter-s 
Maat (Ma'at)
Mafdet (Maftet)
Matit
Medjed
Mehet-Weret 
Mehit (Mehyt, Mekhit)
Menhit (Menchit)
Meret (Mert)
Meretseger (Mertseger)
Merit
Meskhenet (Mesenet, Meshkent, Meskhent)
Mut (Maut, Mout)
Nakith
Neb Ȧa-t (Nebt Ȧa-t)
Neb Ȧa-t-Then (Nebt Ȧa-t-Then)
Neb āāu (Nebt āāu)
Neb-ābui (Nebt-ābui) 
Neb ȧkeb (Nebt ȧkeb)
Neb Ȧnit (Nebt Ȧnit) 
Neb ảri-t-qerr-t (Nebt ȧri-t-qerr-t)
Neb ảrit-tcheṭflu 
Neb ảs-ḥatt
Neb ȧs-ur (Nebt ȧs-ur)
Neb Ȧter (Nebt Ȧter-Meḥ)
Neb ȧter-Shemā (Nebt ȧter-Shemā)
Neb au-t-ȧb
Neb ảur (Nebt ảur)
Neb Aut (Neb-t Aut)
Neb Bȧa-t (Nebt Bȧa-t)
Neb ḥekau (Nebt ḥekau)
Neb ḥetep (Nebt ḥetep) 
Neb Khasa (Nebt Khasa)
Neb Khebit (Nebt Khebit) 
Neb peḥti (Nebt peḥti) 
Neb Per-res (Nebt Per-res)
Neb petti (Nebt petti
Neb Sa (Nebt Sa)
Neb Sam (Nebt Sam)
Neb sau-ta (Nebt sau-ta)
Neb sebu (Nebt sebu)
Neb Septi (Nebt Septi)
Neb Un (Nebt Un)
Neb-t ȧakhu 
Neb-t ȧnemit 
Neb-t ānkh
Neb-t ānkhiu 
Neb-t Ảţu
Neb-t au-t-ȧb 
Neb-t Kheper 
Neb-t usha
Nebethetepet
Nebt Ānnu 
Nebt-Ankhiu
Nebt-Khu
Nebt-Mat
Nebt-Setau
Nebt-Shat
Nebt-Shefshefet
Nebtu
Nebtuwi 
Nefertȧry
Nehmetawy
Neith (Neit, Net, Nit)
Nekhbet
Nephthys (Neber-Het, Nebthet)
Neper (Nepra, Nepri)
Neterit-nekhenit-Rā 
Netrit fent
Nu (Naunet)
Nut (Naunet, Nenet, Nuit, Nunut)
Qetesh 
Pakhet (Pachet, Pasht, Pehkhet, Phastet)
Pelican
Perit
Pesi
Qebhet
Qererti
Qerhet
Qetesh (Qudshu)
Raet-Tawy (Raet)
Rekhit
Renenutet (Ernutet, Renetet)
Renpet 
Repyt 
Sait
Satis (Satet)
Sekhmet (Sachmis, Sakhet, Sakhmet, Sekhet)
Sefkhet-Abwy
Sehith
Sekhat-Hor
Sekhet-Metu
Seret
Serket (Selcis, Selket, Selqet, Serqet)
Sesenet-Khu
Seshat (Safekh-Aubi)
Shemat-Khu
Shentayet
Shenty
Shesmetet (Shesemtet, Shesmet, Smithis)
Sopdet (Sepedet, Sothis)
Swenet
Ta-Bitjet
Ta-Sent-Nefert
Tafner
Taweret (Taouris, Taueret, Taurt, Tawaret, Ta-weret, Thoeris, Thouéris, Toeris, Tuart, Tuat, Twert)
Tayt (Tait, Tayet, Taytet)
Tefnut (Tefnet)
Temet
Temtith
Tenenet (Tanenet, Tenenit, Tjenenet, Zenenet)
Themath
Thermuthis
Thmei
Tjenenyet
Tjenmyt
Un-baiusit (Unt-baiusit)
Unnit
Unnuit
Unut (Unet, Wenet, Wenut)
Upit
Ur-ā 
Urit
Urit-ȧmi-t-Ṭuat 
Urit-em-sekhemu-s
Urit-en-kru 
Urit-ḥekau 
Urti-ḥethati
Usit
Wadjet (Buto, Uadjet, Udjo, Uto, Wedjat)
Wepset 
Werethekau (Urit-hekau, Urthekau, Weret Hekau)
Wosret (Wasret, Wosyet)

Etruscan mythology
Albina
Alpanu (Alpan, Alpnu)
Areatha
Artume (Aritimi, Artumes)
Athrpa
Calaina
Catha (Cath, Cavtha)
Cel
Cerca
Culsu
Elinei (Elina, Elinai)
Enie
Eris
Ethausva (Eth)
Euturpa
Feronia
Horta
Ilithiia
Lasa
Latva
Leinth
Letham (Leta, Letha, Lethms, Lethns)
Letun
Losna
Mania
Mean (Meanpe)
Menrva
Metaia (Metua, Metvia)
Metus
Munthukh
Nurtia
Pemphetru 
Persipnei (Ferspnai, Phersipnai, Phersipnei, Proserpnai)
Semla
Thalna
Thesan
Thethis
Tiur (Tiv, Tivr)
Turan
Uni
Vanth
Vegoia (Begoe, Bigois, Lasa Vecuvia, Vecu, Vecui, Vecuvia)
Vesuna

Georgian mythology
Ainina
Barbale
Dali
Danina (Danana)
Kamar
Lamara 
Mindort-brdzanebeli
Tamar

Khevsurian
Adgilis Deda (Adgilis Ghvtismshobeli)
Samdzimar

Mingrelian
Tkashi-Mapa
Tskarishdida

Svan
Dæl
Lamaria

Germanic mythology

Anglo-Saxon
Ēostre
Fimmilena
Friagabis
Frig
Hrêða
Idis
Wyrd

German
Fraujō
Frijjō (Frija)
Hariasa
Hludana
Holda
Nerþuz
Ostara
Sinthgunt
Sunna (Sowilō)
Tamfana
Volla (Fullō)
Zisa
Alemannic - Alpine - Swabian
Garmangabis
Perchta
Dutch - Frisian - Low German
Baduhenna
Freke
Nehalennia
Sandraudiga
Vagdavercustis
Wurdiz

Langobardic
Frea

Nordic (modern)
Astrild

Norse

Ásynjur
Eir
Frigg
Fulla
Gefjon
Gerðr
Gná
Hlín
Iðunn
Ilmr
Irpa
Lofn
Nanna
Nine Mothers of Heimdallr
Angeyja
Atla
Eistla
Eyrgjafa
Imðr (Imð)
Ulfrún
Njörun
Rán
Rindr
Sága
Sif
Sigyn
Sjöfn
Snotra
Sól
Syn
Þorgerðr 
Þrúðr
Vár
Vör

Jötnar
Angrboða (Angrboda, Iárnvidia)
Aurboða
Bestla
Gjálp
Greip
Hel
Járnsaxa
Jörð (Fjörgyn, Hlóðyn, Iord, Jarð, Jord, Jorth)
Laufey (Nál)
Nine Daughters of Ægir and Rán
Blóðughadda
Bylgja
Dröfn (Bára)
Dúfa
Hefring (Hevring)
Himinglæva
Hrönn
Kólga
Uðr (Unn)
Skaði
Þökk

Vanir
Freyja (Freja, Freya, Freyia)
Gersemi
Gullveig (Heiðr)
Hnoss

Norns
Skuld
Urðr
Verðandi

Valkyries
Brynhildr (Hildr, Sigrdrífa)
Eir
Geirahöð
Geiravör
Geirdriful
Geirönul (Geirölul, Geirömul, Geirrönul)
Geirskögul*
Göll
Göndul
Gunnr (Guðr)
Herfjötur
Herja
Hervör alvitr
Hjalmþrimul
Hjörþrimul
Hlaðguðr svanhvít
Hlökk
Hrist
Hrund
Kára
Mist
Ölrún
Ráðgríðr
Randgríðr (Randgrid)
Reginleif
Róta
Sanngriðr
Sigrún
Skalmöld
Skeggöld (Skeggjöld)
Skögul
Skuld
Sváfa
Sveið
Svipul
Þögn
Þrima
Þrúðr

Other Norse divinities and spirits
Beyla
Dís
Elli
Móðguðr
Nótt
Röskva

Greek mythology
Aceso
Achelois
Achlys
Adephagia
Adikia
Adrasteia (Adastreia, Adrastea, Adrastia, Adrestea)
Adrestia 
Aegiale
Aegle
Aergia
Aidos (Aeschyne)
Alala
Alcyone (Αlkuónē)
Algea
Achos
Ania
Lupe
Amechania (Amekhania)
Amphictyonis
Amphillogiai
Amphitrite
Anaideia
Ananke
Androktasiai
Angelia
Angelos (Angelia)
Antheia
Aoide
Apate
Aphaea
Aphrodite
Apollonis
Aporia
Arae
Arche
Arete
Arke
Artemis
Asteria
Astraea
Astrape
Atë
Athena
Aura
Baubo
Benthesikyme
Bia
Borysthenis
Brimo
Brizo
Bronte
Calliope
Calypso
Carme
Caryatis
Celaeno
Cephisso
Ceto
Charites
Aglaea (Aglaïa)
Charis
Euphrosyne
Kale (Cale, Calleis, Kalleis)
Thalia (Grace)
Chione
Chrysothemis
Circe
Cleta
Clio
Cybele
Daphne
Demeter (Sito, Thesmophoros)
Despoina
Dia
Dindymene
Dione
Doris
Dryad
Atlanteia
Dryope
Epimeliad (Epimēlides)
Erato (dryad)
Eurydice
Hamadryad
Aigeiros
Ampelos
Balanos (Balanus)
Chrysopeleia
Karya (Carya)
Kraneia
Morea
Ptelea
Syke
Meliae
Oread
Claea
Cyllene
Daphnis
Echo
Nomia
Othreis
Pitys
Sinoe
Sphragitides (Cithaeronides)
Phigalia
Phoebe
Dysnomia
Dyssebeia
Eileithyia
Eiresione
Ekecheiria
Electra (Pleiad)
Electryone (Alectrona)
Eleutheria
Elpis
Enodia
Enyo
Eos
Epione
Erato
Erinyes
Alecto
Megaera
Tisiphone
Eris
Ersa
Eucleia
Eukarpia
Eunostus
Eupheme
Euporie
Eupraxia
Eurydome
Eurynome
Euterpe
Euthenia
Gaia
Galene
Graeae
Hamadryas
Harmonia
Hebe
Hecate
Hegemone
Heimarmene
Heliades
Hemera
Hera
Hesperis
Hestia
Hippeia
Homonoia
Horae
Akte (Acte, Cypris)
Anatole (Anatolia)
Arktos (Arctus)
Auge
Auxo (Auco, Auxesia)
Carpo (Carphos, Xarpo)
Cheimon
Damia
Dike
Dysis
Eiar
Eirene
Elete
Eunomia
Euporie (Euporia)
Gymnastike (Gymnasia, Gymnastica)
Hesperis
Mesembria
Mousike (Musica)
Nymphe (Nympha)
Pherusa
Phthinoporon
Sponde
Thallo (Thalatte)
Theros
Horme
Hygieia
Hypate
Hysminai
Ialysos
Iaso
Ichnaea
Idyia
Iris
Kakia
Kalligeneia
Kallone
Kamira
Keres
Kourotrophos
Kotys
Lampad
Lampetia
Lampsace
Lethe
Leto
Libya
Limos
Litae
Lyssa
Macaria
Machai
Maia
Maniae
Melete
Melinoë
Melpomene
Mene
Merope (Pleiades)
Mese
Metis
Mneme
Mnemosyne
Moirai
Atropos (Aisa)
Clotho
Lachesis
 Muses
 Calliope
 Clio 
 Erato 
 Euterpe
 Melpomene
 Polyhymnia 
 Terpsichore
 Thalia
 Urania
Mycene
Nemesis
Nephele
Nesoi
Nete
Nike
Nyx
Oenotropae
Oizys
Palioxis
Pallas
Panacea
Pandia
Pasikrata
Pasiphaë
Pasithea
Peitharchia
Peitho
Penia
Pepromene
Persephone (Kore)
Phaenna
Pheme
Pherusa
Philophrosyne
Philotes
Phoebe
Phrike
Pistis
Planē
Poena
Polyhymnia
Potamides
Potnia Theron
Praxidike
Proioxis
Prophasis
Ptocheia
Rhapso
Rhea
Rhodos
Salmacis
Selene
Sterope (Pleiad)
Taygete
Terpsichore
Thalia (nymph)
Thalia (Muse)
Thebe
Theia
Thelxinoë
Themis
Thetis
Tritonis
Tyche
Urania

Cappadocian
Ma

Cretan
Ariadne
Britomartis (Dictynna)
Idaeae
Adrasteia
Cynosura
Helike
Ida
Oenone

Minoan
Poppy goddess
Snake Goddess

Mycenaean
Adarateja
Artemitos (Artemitei, Atemito, Atimite)
Athana Potnia (Atana Potinija)
Diwia
Doqeia
Eleuthia (Ereutija)
Erewijo Potinija
Erinu (Erinuwe)
Era (Era)
Iphemedeia (Ipemedeja)
Komawenteia (Komaweteja)
Ma-ga (Maga)
Manasa
Mater Theia (Matere Teija)
Newopejo Potinija
Pipituna
Potinija Asiwija
Potnia Hippeia (Potinija Iqeja)
Potnia of the Labyrinth (Dapuritojo Potinija)
Potnia of Sitos (Sito Potinija)
Potnia of Thebes (Potinija Wokode)
Preswa (Pereswa)
Qerasia (Qerasija)
Qowia (Qowija)
Upojo Potinija

Hindu and Jain mythology

Vedic
(inc. Upanishads) (1500-500 BCE onward)
Aditi
Apsaras
Aranyani
Bhūmi (Bhumidevi)
Danu
Diti
Ila (Idā)
Khasa
Nirṛti
Radha
Saranyu
Saraswati
Bharati
Hotr (Hotra)
Shachi (Aindri, Indrani, Mahendri, Poulomi, Pulomaja)

Epic - Puranic
(inc. Ramayana, Mahabharata) (1000-250 BCE onward)
Agneya
Alakshmi
Anasuya (Anusuya)
Anumati
Arundhati
Ashokasundari
Bala Tripurasundari (Bālā, Bālā Tripurasundarī, Kumārikā)
Asvayujau
Bhadra
Buddhi
Chhaya (Chaya)
Devaki
Devasena
Devi
Dhumavati
Dhumorna
Diksa (Diksha)
Dipti
Disa
Ganga (Ganga Devi)
Gulsilia Mata
Hariti
Harsa
Indukari
Issaki
Kadru
Kali (Kālarātri, Kālikā)
Kankar Mata
Kanti
Karttiki
Kaumari (Kartikeyani, Kumari)
Kaumudi
Kirti
Kollapura Mahalakshmi
Ksama (Kshama)
Kubuddhi
MahaLakshmi
Alamelu (Alamelu manga, Padmavati)
Ashta Lakshmi
Adi Lakshmi (Maha Lakshmi)
Aishwarya Lakshmi
Dhana Lakshmi
Dhanya Lakshmi
Gaja Lakshmi
Jaya Lakshmi (Vijaya Lakshmi)
Raja Lakshmi (Rajya Lakshmi)
Santana Lakshmi
Saubhagya Lakshmi
Vara Lakshmi
Veera Lakshmi (Dhairya Lakshmi)
Vidya Lakshmi
Dharani
Kamalatmika (Kamala)
Laghusyamala
Manasa (Mansa Devi)
Mohini
Nakshatras
Abhijit
Anurādhā
Ashlesha (Aslesa)
Ashvini
Bharani
Chitrā
Dhanishta
Hasta
Jyestha
Kṛttikā (Krittika)
Maghā
Mrigashīrsha (Mārgaśīrṣa, Mṛgaśira)
Mula
Punarvasu (Punarpusam, Punartham)
Purva Ashadha
Pūrva Bhādrapadā
Purva Phalguni
Pushya (Pooyam, Tishya)
Revati
Rohinī
Shatabhisha
Shravana
Svati (Swati)
Uttara Ashadha
Uttara Bhādrapadā
Uttara Phalguni
Vishākhā
Parvati (Pārvatī, Uma, Umā)
Akilandeswari (Akhilāṇḑeśvarī)
Ambika
Annapurna Devi Mata
Brahmani
Bhutamata
Durga
Aticandika
Bambar Baini
Bhadrakali
Bhagavati
Bhavani
Bhuvaneshvari
Bipodtarini Devi
Brahmacharini
Chamunda (Camunda, Carcika, Charchika Devi)
Krsodari
Chanda
Kundali (Kundalini)
Mahishasuramardini
Navadurga
Brahmacharini
Chandraghanta
Kalaratri
Kātyāyanī
Kushmanda
Mahagauri
Shailaputri
Siddhidhatri
Skandamata
Vanadurga
Gauri
Kaushiki
Tripura Sundari
Bagalamukhi
Prithvi (Dharti Mata)
Shakti
Adi Parashakti (Adishakti, Maha Shakti, Parama Shakti)
Bhairavi
Chandi (Chandika)
Chhinnamasta
Kubjika
Bahuchara Mata
Bhramari
Gangamma Devi
Vinata

Dravidian (non-Vedic or Puranic)
Vanadevata
Kannada
Ammavaru
Chelamma
Kolaramma
Khond (Kui - Kuvi)
Bera Pennu
Kurukh - Oraon
Anna Kuari
Tamil
Ankalamma (Ankalamman)
Ankalaparamecuvari
Bala-Sakti
Cenkalaniyammal
Ellaman (Ellaiyamman)
Kamakshi (Kamaksi, Kamakshi Amman)
Karaikkal Ammaiyar
Korravai

Indic (non-Vedic or Puranic)
Assamese
Budhi Pallien
Balochi
Hinglaj Mata
Bengali
Bonobibi
Didi Thakrun
Hatthi
Hulka Devi
Bhil
Hammu Mata
Dhangar
Banai
Mhalsa
Gujarati
Harkor
Harsidhhi
Jeen Mata
Modheshwari
Kutchi
Ashapura Mata (Kuldevi)
Marwari
Nagnechiya Maa
Newari
Kumari
Odia
Bankamundi
Saharia
Badi Mata

Modern Hindu
Bharat Mata

temporarily unsorted
Chenjiamman
Dev Mogra
Devi Kanya Kumari
Dewi Danu
Dewi Ratih
Dhavdi
Dhisana
Durga Ashtami
Durga Puja
Ekanamsha
Gajalakshmi
Gayatri
Harsidhhi
Hemadryamba
Ila
Ishvari
Jagaddhatri
Jaganmata
Jagdamba
Jayanti
Jivdani Mata
Kamadhenu
Kamakhya
Kamalatmika
Kanike
Kannagi
Kateri Amman
Kaushiki
Khemukhi
Khodiyar
Kolaramma
Kubjika
Kumari
Kurupuram
Lajja Gauri
Lankini
Maa Tarini
Maalikapurathamma
Madayi Kavu
Mahadevi
Mahakali
Mahavidya
Maheshvari
Maisamma
Malabai
Manakamana
Manda
Manisha
Matangi
Matrikas
Maula Kalika
Modheshwari
Mumbadevi (Mumbā)
Muthyalamma
Nandni Mata
Navadurga (regional goddess)
Nila Devi
Panchakanya
Paranasabari
Pathibhara
Periyachi
Phul Mata
Pidari
Poleramma
Prasuti
Pratyangira
Putana
Rakteswari
Rati
Ratri
Renuka
Revati
Rudrani
Rukmini
Sachiya (Sachayay Mata, Sachchika, Sachchiya Mata, Sachchiyay Mata)
Saibini
Samaleswari
Santoshi Mata
Sarama
Sarthal Mata
Sati
Satyabhama
Shakambhari
Shantadurga
Shashthi
Shatarupa
Sheetla
Shitala
Shivadooti
Sinivali
Sita
Sri Ramalinga Sowdeswari Amman
Surasa
Svaha
Swasthani
Tapati
Tara
Tridevi
Trijata
Tulsi
Ushas
Vāc
Vaishnavi
Vaishno Devi
Vajreshwari
Vakula Devi
Valli
Varahi
Varuni
Vasavi Kanyaka Parameswari
Vijayadurga
Vinayaki
Vindhyavasini
Yamuna (Yami)
Yogini

Jainism
Acchupta
Ambika (Ambikā, Ambikā Devī)
Buddhi
Cakresvari
Devananda
Dhrti
Gandhari
Gauri
Kulisankusa

Hittite mythology
Hattian
Eštan (Urunzimu, Wurunšemu)
Ḫannaḫanna
Hatepuna
Istustaya
Kataḫziwuri
Mezulla (Tappinu)
Papaya
Zintuḫi

Hittite
Ala
Arinniti (Ištanu)
Aserdus
Gulses (Gulshesh)
Ḫannaḫanna
Hanwasuit
Inara
Istustaya
Lelwani
Maliya
Mezulla
Papaya
Tarawa
Zulki

Luwian
Ala
Ḫapantali
Kamrušepa
Maliya

Carian
Aphrodisias

Lydian
Kuvava

Hmong-Mien mythology
Hmong
Kab Yeeb
Yao
Milotou

Ibero-Lusitanian mythology
Ataegina (Ataecina)
Bandua
Duillae
Nabia
Trebaruna
Trebopala

Indonesian mythology
Dewi Kwan Im (Mak Kwan Im)
Balinese
Dewi Danu
Dewi Ratih
Rangda
Setesuyara
Javanese
Dewi Lanjar
Dewi Ratih
Dewi Sri
Nyai Roro Kidul
Nias
Silewe Nazarate
Seram
Hainuwele
Sundanese
Nyai Pohaci Sanghyang Asri
Sunan Ambu
Toraja
Indo' Belo Tumbang
Indo' Ongon-Ongon

Inuit mythology
A'akuluujjusi
Akna
Ataksak
Aulanerk
Ignirtoq
Kadlu
Kweetoo (Kweeto)
Malina
Nujalik
Pinga
Pukimna
Pukkeenegak
Qailertetang
Sedna (Sanna)
Seqinek
Tootega
Iglulingmiut
Takánakapsâluk (Takannaaluk)
Iñupiat (Alaska)
Akycha
Nerrivik
Kalaallit (Greenland Inuit)
Arnakuagsak (Arnakua'gsak, Arnaqquassaaq, Arnarquagsag, Sassuma Arnaa)
Asiaq
Immap Ukua
Kitlinermiut (Copper Inuit)
Arnapkapfaaluk
Netsilingmiut (Netsilik Inuit)
Isarraitaitsoq
Nuliajuk
Yupighyt (Siberian Yupik)
Ka'cak

Iranian mythology
Iranian
Anahita (Aredvi Sura Anahita, Nahid)
Mah (Mangha)
Iranian - Zoroastrian
Ahurani
Ameretat (Amordad, Amurdad, Mordad)
Arshtat (Ashtad)
Ashi (Ahrishwang, Ashi Vanghuhi, Ashi Vanuhi)
Bushyasta (Bushasp)
Daena (Den, Dena)
Drvaspa
Haurvatat (Hordad, Khordad)
Jahi (Jeh)
Spenta Armaiti (Spendarmad)
Zarik (Zarich)
Kushan
Ardoxsho
lrooaspa
Mao
Nana
Salini
Ossetian
Satana
Scythian
Api
Artimpasa or Argimpasa
Tabiti

Malagasy mythology
Andriaahoabu
Andriamahilala
Andriamanitra

Meitei mythology 

 Leimarel Sidabi
 Haoreima
 Imoinu
 Irai Leima
 Khunu Leima
 Khamnung Kikoi Louonbi
 Konthoujam Tampha Lairembi
 Koujeng Leima
 Kounu
 Laikhurembi
 Lainaotabi
 Ngaleima
 Nganu Leima
 Nungthel Leima
 Nongthang Leima
 Panthoibi
 Phouoibi
 Shapi Leima
 Shopkeeping Goddesses
 Thongak Lairembi
 Thumleima
 Yumjao Leima
 Yenakha Paotapi

Mesopotamian mythology

Akkadian / Assyrian / Babylonian 
Annunitum
Antu 
Ašḫara
Ashnan
Aya
Belet-Ili
Belet-Seri
Belet-Šuḫnir and Belet-Terraban
Gazbaba
Ishtar
Kittum
Laṣ
Mami (Belet Ili, Mama, Nintu)
Mamitu (Mammitum)
Mullissu 
Sarpanit 
Shala
Šarrāḫītu
Šassūrātu
Šerua
Tashmetum
Uṣur-amāssu

Eblaite 
 Adamma
 Barama
 Ishara
 Shalash

Elamite
Kiririsha
Manzat
Narundi
Pinikir

Hurrian 
Allani
Ayu-Ikalti
Dadmiš
DINGIR.GE6
Hebat
Hutena and Hutellura
Ishara
Kubaba
Lelluri
Nabarbi
Nikkal
Ninatta and Kulitta
Pentikalli
Pinikir
Shaushka
Shuwala
Takitu

Kassite
Shumaliya

Mariote
Belet Nagar
Ishtarat
Lagamal
Ninkarrak

Sumerian
Amasagnudi
Azimua
Bau
Belili
Bizilla
Dumuzi-abzu
Duttur
Ereshkigal
Ezina
Gatumdag 
Geshtinanna
Gula
Gunura
Hegir-Nuna 
Hedimeku
Hušbišag
Imzuanna
Inanna 
Kanisurra
Ki
Kusu
Lammašaga
Lisin
Mamu
Manungal 
Nammu
Nanaya
Nanshe
Nisaba
Ninegal
Ningal
Ningikuga
Ningirida
Ningirima
Ninhursag (Aruru, Damgalnuna, Damkina, Ninmah, Nintu)
Ninigizibara
Ninimma
Ninisina
Ninkarrak
Ninkasi
Ninkurra
Ninlil
Nin-MAR.KI
Ninmena
Ninmug
Ninnibru
Ninpumuna
Ninšar
Ninshubur
Ninsianna
Ninsikila
Ninsun (Ninsumun)
Ninti
Nintinugga 
Shala
Siris
Shuzianna
Urash
Uttu

Melanesian and New Guinean mythology
Abeguwo
Abere
Fijian
Adi-mailagu
Lewalevu
Solomon Islands - Kwaio
La'aka
Vanuatu - Malekula
Nevinbimbaau

Micronesian mythology
Kiribati
Nei Tituaabine
Nauruan
Eijebong

Monotheistic religions

Holy Spirit is feminine for some Christians
Shekinah

Native American and First Nations mythologies

Algonquian
Abenaki (Penobscot)
Nok-a-mi
Algonquin
Mooinarkw (Grandmother Bear)
Nemissa
Nokomis
Pook-jin-skwess
Winonah
Lenape (Delaware)
Netami-gho
Menominee
Awasiukiu
Masâkamek'okiu
Pêp'âkijisê
Pikâkamik'okiu
Ojibwe (Chippewa, Ojibway)
Asibikaashi
Gawaunduk
Geezhigo-Quae
Muzzu-Kummik-Quae
Shawnee
Weshellequa (Kohkomhdena, Paapooddkwaki)

Araucanian
Chilote
Coi Coi-Vilu
Ten Ten-Vilu

Mapuche
Kueyen

Arawakan
Taíno
Atabey
Caguana
Guabancex

Caddoan
Arikara
Atina
Pawnee
Atira
Pah
Uti Hiata (Mother Corn)

Chibchan
Muisca
Bachué
Chía
Huitaca

Chimakuan
Quileute
Duskeah

Chinookan
Chinook
Ioi
Wah-Kah-Nee
Multnomah
Loo-Wit

Chumashan
Chumash
Hutash
Momoy

Haida
Dju
Dzelarhons (Djila'qons)
Rhpisunt
Tia
Xaalajaat (Copper Woman)

Iroquoian
Cherokee
Aaghu Gugu
Ailsie
Elihino
Igaehinvdo
Kanene Ski Amai Yehi (Spider Grandmother)
Nunda Igehi
Sehu
Sélu 
Unelanuhi
U'thu Uta 
Utlunta
Iroquois
Atahensic (Ataensic, Ataentsic)
Djigonasee
Eithinoha
Gendenwitha
Genetaska
Lelawala
Onatah
Iroquois - Onondaga
O-ne-ha-tah
Oo-kwa-we
Iroquois - Seneca
Eagentci
Tuscarora
Godasiyo
Wyandot (Huron)
Djigonasee
Mahohrah
Wäh-trōhn-yŏ-nōh'-nĕh

Jivaroan
Nungui

Keresan
Iyatiku
Tsichtinako (Thought Woman)

Mayan
Akhushtal
Akna
Chibirias (Ix Chebel Yax, Ix Hun Tah Dz'ib, Ix Hun Tah Nok, Ix Zacal Nok)
Chimalmat
Chirakan-Ixmucane
Colel Cab
Ix Kanan
Ixazaluoh
Xbaquiyalo
Xpuch
Xtah
Chontal
C'abawil Ix
Ixchel
Xtabai
K'iche
Awilix (Auilix, Avilix)
E Akom
Ixchel
Xmucane
Xpiacoc
Xquic
Lacandon
Mayahuel
Yucatec
Ixchel
Ixtab
Xtabay
unnamed
Goddess I
Maya moon goddess

Muskogean
Choctaw
Abohli
Eskeilay
Heloha
Hvashi
Ohoyochisba
Puchi Yushuba

Na-Dene
Athabaskan
Asintmah (Atsintma)
Diné (Navajo)
Áłtsé Asdzáán (First Woman)
Asdzą́ą́ Nádleehé (Estsanatlehi) (Changing Woman, Turquoise Woman); Yoołgai Asdzą́ą́ (White Shell Woman)
Baʼáłchíní
Dilyéhé (Planting Stars)
Haashchʼéé Baʼáádí (Hastsébaádi, Qastcebaad, Yebaad) (Female Divinity)
Haashchʼéé Oołtʼohí (Hastséoltoi, Hastyeoltoi, Shooting God)
Hakʼaz Asdzą́ą́ (Cold Woman)
Náhookǫs Baʼáádí (Whirling Woman)
Na'ashjé'ii Asdzáá (Spider Grandmother)
Są́ (Old Age Woman)
Tséghádiʼnídíinii Atʼééd (Rock Crystal Girl)

Gwich'in
Tetogolee
Tahltan (Nahanni)
Cenakatla'x (Salmon Woman)
Tlingit
Djiyin
Gaus!tukoba'ni

Natchez
Wah Sil

Oto-Manguean
Otomi
Acpaxapo
Mudu
Nohpyttecha
Zäna

Penutian
Klamath-Modoc
Loha
Lok Snewédjas
Máidicdac
Moasäm Beps
Waslaag
Witsduk
Sahaptin (Tenino / Umatilla / Walla Walla / Yakima)
Pahto

Pomoan
Pomo
Baculbotet
Duwe da (Night Woman)
Luhdee
Totolmatha
Xa'a da (Day Woman)

Quechuan
Incan
Axomamma
Cavillace
Ch'aska (Ch'aska Quyllur)
Copacati
Ka-Ata-Killa
Kukamama
Mama Allpa
Mama Killa (Mama Quilla)
Mama Ocllo
Mama Qucha
Mama Sara (Saramama)
Pachamama (Mama Pacha)

Salishan
Chehalis
Chietsum
Nuxalk (Bella Coola)
Anaulikutsai'x
Klallam
Nahkeeta
Nonō'osqua
Nunuso
Qamaits
Tlitcaplitana
Salish - Spokane - Kalispell
Tacoma
Sduk-al-bixw (Snoqualmie)
Qeuxu
Syilx (Okanagan)
Enamtues
Scomalt

Siouan
Ho-Chunk (Winnebago)
C-ga
Iowa - Missouria - Otoe
Núwakanda
Lakota
Hanwi (Hanhepi Wi)
Maka
Unhcegila
Unk
Wóȟpe (Ptehíŋčalasaŋwiŋ)
Osage
Wakonda Hon Don
Watse Miga
Mikak'e Ukithath'in
Wakonda Hon Nonpathe
Wakonda Hiutseta

Tanoan
Kiowa
Pasowee
Selmayi
Tewa
Panyoka
Pohaha
Tiwa
Ee-eh-ch-chó-ri-ch'áhm-nin
P'áh-hlee-oh

Tsimshianic
Tsimshian
Nalq

Tupian
Caipora

Guarani
Arasy
Jande Jari
Kerana
Sypave

Uto-Aztecan
Aztec
Chalchiuhtlicue
Chalmecacihuitl
Chantico (Cuauhxolotl)
Chicomecoatl (Centeocihuatl, Xilonen)
Chiconahui
Chimalma (Chimalman)
Cihuacalli
Cihuacoatl (Chihucoatl, Quilaztli)
Cihuacuauhtli
Cihuacuiahuitl
Cihuamazatl
Cihuaozomatl
Cihuateteo
Cipactli
Citlalicue (Citlalinicue, Ilamatecuhtli)
Coatlicue (Atlatonan, Teteoh Innan)
Coyolxauhqui
Huixtocihuatl (Uixtochihuatl)
Ixnextli
Itzcuintli
Itzpapalotl
Itzcueye (Itzpapaloti-Itzcueye)
Malinalxochitl (Malinalxoch)
Mayahuel
Metztli
Mictecacihuatl
Oxomoco
Quetzalcoatl
Temazcalteci
Tlazolteotl
Toci (Tlalli Iyollo)
Tonacacihuatl
Tonantzin (Chalchiuhcihuatl, Chicomexochitl)
Tzitzimitl
Xochiquetzal (Ichpochtli)
Yohaulticetl
Cahuilla
Menil (Menily)
Hopi
Ahöl Mana (Spring Maiden)
Angak-chin Mana (Kocha Mana) (White Maiden)
Angwushahai-i (Crow Bride)
Angwusnasomtaka (Crow Mother)
Hahay-i Wuhti (Pour Water Grandmother)
Hano Mana (Tewa Maiden)
Hé-é-e Wuhti (He Wuhti, Hehea Mana, Hehee, Teakwaina Mana) (Warrior Woman)
Heoto Mana (Guard Woman)
Horo Mana (Yohozro Wuhti) (Cold-bringing Woman)
Kahaila Mana (Turtle Maiden)
Kokopelmimi
Kokyang Wuhti (Spider Grandmother)
Koyemsi Mana (Mudhead Maiden)
Mosairu Mana (Buffalo Maiden)
Navuk-chin Mana (Nuvak-chin Mana) (Snow Maiden)
Qoqole Mana (Marble Player Maiden)
Pachavuin Mana 
Palhik Mana (Water Drinking Maiden)
Pavin Mana (Water Maiden)
Poli Mana (Butterfly Maiden)
Sakwa Mana (Kachin Mana) (Blue Corn Maiden)
Shalako Mana (Giant Cloud Maiden)
Sowi-ing Mana (Deer Maiden)
Soyal Mana (Winter Solstice Maiden)
Soyok Mana (Natacka Mana) (Ogre Maiden)
Soyok Wuhti (Natacka Wuhti) (Ogre Grandmother)
Takursh Mana (Yellow Corn Maiden)
Talakin
Tukwinong Mana (Cumulus Cloud Maiden)
Payómkawichum (Luiseño)
Chehiayam
Tomaiyovit
Taaqtam (Serrano)
Pahalali
Tarahumara (Rarámuri)
Iyeruame (Iyerúgame)
Tlaxcalan
Matlalcueitl
Tongva (Gabrieleño)
Chehooit

Wakashan
Kwakwaka'wakw (Kwakiutl)
E'lg'eldokwila

Wintuan
Wintu
Mem Loimis
Nomhewena Pokaila
Norwan
Pakchuso Pokaila
Yonot

Yaruro
Puana

Yuman
Mohave
Cathena
Nyohaiva
Quechan (Yuma)
Sanyu.xáv
Warharmi

Zuni
Awitelin Tsta (Awitelin Tsita)

Paleo-Balkan mythology
Illyrian
Prende
Thana (Thiana)
Liburnian
Anzotica 
Thracian 
Bendis
Iambadoule
Kotys

Philippine mythology
Bikolano
Bakunawa
Bituoon
Dagat
Daragang Magayon
Haliya
Oryol
Cuyunon
Diwata ng Kagubatan
Ibaloi
Akodau
Daungen
Ifugao
Bangan
Bugan inBulul
Bugan inIntongnin
Bugan inKinulhudan
Bugan inMagnad
Bugan inManahaut
Bugan inMonkulabe
Bugan inNgilin
Bugan inPati
Bugan inPunholdaiyan
Bugan inUldi
Bugan inWigan
Bugan nak Amtalao
Bugan nak Hinumbian
Manolge inBahiwag
Isnag
Alindodoay
Anat
Annawan
Arurin
Balintawag
Bugan
Dagdagamiyan
Dinawágan
Itneg
Agemem
Alokotán
Asībowan
Gaygayóma
Sīnag
Kankanaey
Ag-aganney
Kapampangan
Apúng Sinukuan
Indung Tibuan 
Lakanbini
Mangechay (Mangacha)
Mingan
Sisilim
Mangyan
Binayo
Manobo
Baītpandī
Balinsogo
Bia-ka-pusud-an-langit
Bia-t'oden
Bulan
Dagau
Darago
Palawan
Linamin at Barat 
Linamin at Bulag
Sambal
Aniton Tauo
Tagakaulo
Bodek
Tagalog
Anitun Tabu
Anagolay
Diyan Masalanta
Hanan
Hukluban
Idiyanale
Lakapati
Mananangal
Manggagaway
Manisilat
Maria Makiling
Mayari
Tala
Tboli
Bong Libun
Bulon La Mogoaw 
La Fun
Tiruray
Minaden
Visayan
Abyang
Abyang Durunuun
Alunsina
Burigadang Pada Sinaklang Bulawan
Dalikamata
Lalahon
Lidagat
Lisuga
Lubay-Lubyok Hanginun si Mahuyokhuyokan
Luyong Baybay
Maguayan (Magwayan)
Maria Cacao
Nagmalitong Yawa Sinagmaling Diwata
Suklang Malayon

Phrygian mythology
Adrasteia
Matar Kubileya (Matar Kubeleya)

Polynesian mythology
Atarapa
Hina
Hine-i-Tapeka
Hine-Tu-Whenua
Ira
Merau
Hawaiian
Haumea
Hina-Lau-Limu-Kala
Hina-puku-ia
Ka'ohelo
Kalamainu'u
Kapo
Laka
Mahina
Nuakea
Papahānaumoku
Pele
Poliʻahu
Waka
Mangaian
Hina-moe-aitu
Miru
Papa (Papatūānuku)
Ro'e
Tu-metua
Tumu-te-ana-oa
Vaiare
Varima-te-takere
Māori
Ārohirohi
Hina
Hine-ahuone
Hine-nui-te-pō (Hine-Ata-Uira, Hine-Titama)
Hine-titamauri
Kohara
Kui
Mahuika
Miru
Rohe
Te Anu-matao
Whaitiri
Marquesan
Atanua
Moriori
Rohe
Niue
Hokohoko
Rapa Nui
Atua-anua
Hina-Oio
Manana Take
Riri-tuna-rai
Samoan
Ele-ele
Leutogi
I'i
Nafanua
Sina
Taema
Tilafaiga
Tahitian
Ai-tupuai
Hina
Ihi
Potii-ta-rire
Rearea
Taonoui
Te-uri
Tuamotu
Faumea
Hina
Hina-Arau-Riki

Proto-Indo-European mythology
Dheghom
Hausos

Roman mythology
Abeona
Abundantia
Acca Larentia
Adeona
Aequitas
Aeternitas
Africa
Agenoria
Alala
Alemona (Alemonia)
Angerona
Angitia
Anna Perenna
Annona
Antevorta
Arachne
Aura
Aurora
Bellona
Bona Dea
Britannia
Bubona
Camenae
Candelifera
Cardea
Carmenta
Ceres
Cinxia
Clementia
Cloacina
Concordia
Cuba
Cunina
Cura
Dea Dia
Dea Tacita
Decima
Deverra
Di nixi
Diana
Dies
Disciplina
Edesia
Edusa
Egeria
Empanda
Epona
Fauna
Faustitas
Febris
Fecunditas
Felicitas
Ferentina
Feronia
Fides
Flora
Fornax
Fortuna
Fortuna Huiusce Diei
Fortuna Redux
Fortuna Virilis
Fraus
Fulgora
Furrina
Gallia
Hecate
Hersilia
Hippona
Iana
Intercidona
Invidia
Iustitia
Juno
Juno Caelestis
Juturna
Juventas
Laetitia
Larentina
Laverna
Levana
Libera
Liberalitas
Libertas
Libitina
Lima
Lua
Lucina
Luna
Lympha
Magna Dea
Mana Genita
Mania
Mater Larum
Mater Matuta
Meditrina
Mefitis
Mellona
Minerva
Molae
Moneta
Morta
Murcia
Nascio
Necessitas
Nerio
Nona
Ops
Orbona
Palatua
Pales
Parcae
Partula
Patelana
Paventia
Pax
Pellonia
Poena
Pomona
Postverta
Potina
Prorsa Postverta
Proserpina
Providentia
Pudicitia
Puta
Querquetulanae
Quiritis
Regina Caeli
Robigo
Roma
Rumina
Rusina
Salacia
Securitas
Semonia
Sentia
Silvanae
Spes
Stata Mater
Stimula
Strenua
Suadela
Tempestas
Terra
Tranquillitas
Trivia
Tutela
Tutelina
Ultio
Vacuna
Vallonia
Venilia
Venus
Venus Castina
Venus Verticordia
Veritas
Vesta
Vica Pota
Victoria
Viriplaca
Virtus
Volumna
Volutina

Slavic mythology
Baba Slata (Baba Gvozdenzuba, Baba Korizma, Slata Baba, Zlatá Baba, Zlota-Baba, Zolotaya Baba)
Baba Yaga (Baba Gvozdenzuba, Baba Korizma, Baba Roga, Gorska Maika, Jaga Baba, Ježibaba, Pehtra Baba, Sumska Majka)
Bereginia (Beregynia, Berehynia, Przeginia)
Boginka 
Chislobog (Kricco, Zislobog)
Darinka
Devana (Cica, Cisa, Ciza, Cyca, Devoina, Dewana, Dewin, Dewina, Didilia, Didilla, Diewana, Diewen, Diiwica, Dzidziela, Dzidzilelya, Dziedzilia, Dziewanna, Dziewica, Dziewina, Dziewitza, Dziewonna, Dziwitza, Dzydzilelya, Sisa, Zeiz, Zewena, Ziewonia, Ziza, Zizilia, Zyzlila)
Perperuna and Dodola (Paparuda, Prporuša, Dudula, Doda etc.)
Domania (Damavukha, Domovikha, Marukha, Volossatka)
Karna
Kikimora
Kostroma
Kupala (Kupalnica, Kupalnitsa, Sointse)
Lada 
Lelia
Leshachikha (Lesovikha, Leszachka)
Matergabia (Matka Gabia)
Marzanna (Mamuriena, Mara, Marena, Marmora, Marmuriena, Maržena, Maslenitsa, Mora, Morana, Morena)
Mokosh (Mat Zemlya, Mokoš)
Ognyena Maria (Marija Glavjenica, Marija Ognjenica, Ognevikha, Ognjena Mariya, Ognyena, Onennaya, Onennaya Mariya)
Ozwiena
Poludnica (Chirtel Ma, Polednica, Polednice, Poloznicha, Południca, Poludniowka, Poludnitsa, Poludnitza, Přezpołdnica, Připołdnica, Przypoludnika)
Rodiva - Rozanica (Baba, Deva, Dewa, Dzewa, Krasopani, Razivia, Raziwia, Rodiwa, Rodjenica, Rodzhanitsa, Rojanitsa, Rozhdenica, Udelnica)
Rusalka
Samodiva (Vila)
Sudenica (Orisnica, Sudica)
Uroda
Ursula (Horsel, Orsel, Ursala)
Veliona (Veliuona, Velonia, Vielona, Vielonia)
Vesna (Wiosna)
Vida (Wida, Wita, Vita)
Živa (Razivia, Sieba, Siua, Siva, Siwa, Zhiva, Zywie, Zywye)
Zorya (Zorya Utrennyaya, Zorya Vechernyaya, Zorya Polunoshnaya, Zvezda, Zvezda Dennitsa, Zvezda Vechernyaya)

Thai mythology
Chaomae Thongkham (Chaomae Thapthim)
Kuan Im (Chao Mae Kuan Im, Phra Mae Kuan Im)
Nang Kwak
Phosop
Phra Mae Thorani (Mae Phra Thorani, Nang Thorani)

Tungusic mythology
Jurchen - Manchu
Abkai Hehe
Bana-jiermu
Tuoyalaha

Turkic mythology
Ak Ana
Etugen Eke
Gun Ana
Kubai
Od Ana
Su Ana
Umay
Yer Tanrı

Umbrian mythology
Angitia
Cupra

Uralic mythology

Finnic
Estonian
Äiatar
Ehaema
Hämarik
Ilmaneitsi (Ilmatütar)
Ilo
Jutta
Kalmuneiu
Kuu
Linda
Maan-Emo
Vete-ema
Finnish (inc. Karelian)
Ajatar (Aiätär, Aijotar, Ajattara)
Akka (Maaemonen)
Ilmatar (Luonnotar)
Kalma
Kipu-tyttö
Kivutar
Kuutar
Loviatar / Louhi (Louhetar, Louhiatar, Loveatar, Loveheta, Lovetar)
Mielikki
Päivätär
Syöjätär
Tellervo
Tuonetar
Vammatar
Veenemo
Vellamo (Wellamo)
Sami
Akka
Beaivi (Beivve, Beiwe, Biejje, Bievve)
Jabme-Akka
Juksakka
Maderakka
Mano
Sarakka
Rana Niejta
Uksakka

Mari
Čodõra-kuva
Jumõn Šočõn
Jumõn Üdõr
Mlandava
Piambar 
Šočõn Ava

Mordvinic
Erzya
Mastorava

Permic
Komi
Zarni Ań
Udmurt
Inmar

Ugric
Hungarian
Boldogasszony (Istenanya, Nagyboldogasszony)
Hajnal Anyácska
Nap Anya
Szélanya
Tűz Anya
Víz Anya
Khanty
Kaltes Ankw
Mansi
Kaltes-Ekwa

Vainakh mythology
(inc. Chechen, Ingush, Kist)
Dartsa-Naana
Mokh-Naana
Mozh
Seelasat (Sata, Sela-Sata)
Tusholi

Venetic mythology
Reitia

Vietnamese mythology
(inc. Vietnamese folk religion, Cao Đài, Đạo Mẫu)
Âu Cơ
Bà Chúa Kho
Bà Chúa Xứ (Chúa Xứ Thánh Mẫu)
Bà Đen
Bà mụ
Bà Triệu
Tây Vương Mẫu (Bà Trời, Diêu Trì Kim Mẫu)
Hai Bà Trưng
Mẫu Cửu Trùng Thiên
Liễu Hạnh (Mẫu Thượng Thiên)
Mẫu Địa Phủ
Mẫu Thoải (Thủy cung Thánh Mẫu)
Mẫu Thượng Ngàn (Bà Chúa Thượng Ngàn, Cô Đôi Thượng Ngàn, Lâm Cung Thánh Mẫu)
Địa Mẫu (Quảng Cung Công chúa)
Quán Thế Âm (Quan Âm)
Thiên Hậu
Thiên Y A Na
Phật Mẫu Man Nương
Pháp Vân (Bà Dâu) and another incarnation called Bà Keo
Pháp Vũ (Bà Đậu)
Pháp Lôi (Bà Tướng)
Pháp Điện (Bà Dàn)
Ỷ Lan
Đinh triều Thánh Mẫu
 Phạm Thị Trân
Vua Bà (Thủy Tổ Quan họ)

West Semitic mythology
Canaanite - Phoenician
Ashima
Aspalis
Astarte
Atargatis
Ba'alat Gebal
Derceto
Tanit

Moabite
Ashtar-Chemosh

Ugaritic
Anat
Arsay
ʼAṯirat
ʼAttart
Dadmiš
Kotharat
Nikkal-wa-Ib
Pidray
Shapash
Shatiqatu
Tallay
Ušḫara

Wiccan mythology
Triple Goddess (Neopaganism)

National personifications
Albania : Nëna Shqipëri
Armenia : Mayr Hayastan
Bangladesh : Bangamata
Belgium : Belgica (La Belgique)
Brazil : Efígie da República
Bulgaria : Maika Bulgariya
Cambodia : Neang Neak
Egypt : Om El Donia
Finland : Suomi-neito
France : Marianne
Georgia : Kartlis Deda
Germany : Germania
Greece : Hellas
Haiti : Ezili Dantor, Katrin
Hungary : Lady of Hungaria
Iceland : Fjallkona
India : Bharat Mata
Indonesia : Ibu Pertiwi
Ireland : Éire, Banba, Cailleach, Fódla, Gráinne Mhaol Hibernia, Kathleen Ni Houlihan
Italy : Italia turrita
Japan : Amaterasu
Macedonia : Mother Macedonia
Malta : Melita
Mexico : Alegoría de la Patria Mexicana, China poblana, Nuestra Señora de Guadalupe
Montenegro : Mother Montenegro
Netherlands : Nederlandse Maagd
New Zealand : Zealandia
Norway : Mor Norge, Kari Nordmann
North Korea : Ungnyeo
Peru : La Madre Patria
Philippines : María Clara
Poland : Poland
Portugal : Efígie da República
Romania : România
Russia : Matushka Rossiya, Rodina-mat'
Serbia : Majka Srbija
South Korea: Ungnyeo
Spain : Alegoría de España
Suriname : Mama Sranan
Sweden : Moder Svea
Switzerland : Helvetia
United Kingdom : Britannia
United States : Lady Liberty, Columbia
Vietnam : Liễu Hạnh

Intentionally Fictional goddesses

Dungeons and Dragons
Aasterinian
Aerdrie Faenya
Alausha
Blibdoolpoolp 
Cegilune
Charmalaine
Cyrollalee
Dallah Thaun
Diancastra
Duthila
Eilistraee
Eshebala
Fionnghuala
Great Mother
Hanani Celanil
Iallanis
Kiaransalee
Kuliak
Lolth
Luthic
Queen of Air and Darkness
Sehanine Moonbow
Sheela Peryroyl
Shekinester
Sheyanna Flaxenstrand
Soorinek
Syranita
Tamara
Theleya
Tiamat
Titania
Trishina
Ulaa
Valkauna
Vandria Gilmadrith
Ventila
Verenestra
Whale Mother
Yondalla
Zinzerena
Dragonlance
Chislev
Lunitari
Mina
Mishakal
Shinare
Takhisis
Zeboim
Forgotten Realms
Akadi
Auril
Beshaba
Chauntea
Eldath
Lliira
Loviatar
Lurue
Mielikki
Mystra
Selûne
Shar
Sune
Talona
Tymora
Umberlee 
kubos 
rgpogi
zak
farbans
Kore

Legend of Zelda
Din (Goddess of Power)
Farore (Goddess of Courage)
Hylia (aka "The Goddess")
Nayru (Goddess of Wisdom)

Middle Earth
Arien
Estë
Ilmarë
Melian
Nessa
Nienna
Uinen
Vairë
Vána
Varda
Yavanna

Mythos (inc. Lovecraft, Derleth, Ashton Smith etc.)
C'thalpa
D’endrrah
Lu-Kthu
Mother of Pus
Shub-Niggurath
Star Mother
Yhoundeh
Yidhra

Anime and Manga 

Belldandy - Oh My Goddess! 
Urd - Oh My Goddess!
Skuld - Oh My Goddess!
Holo - Spice and Wolf
Aqua - KonoSuba
Ristarte - Cautious Hero
Valkyrie - Cautious Hero
Hestia - Danmachi
Haruhi Suzumiya - the melancholy of haruhi suzumiya

Transformice 

 Elisah - Goddess shaman
 Lannanah
 The Three Shaman Queens

Hyperdimension Neptunia 

 Neptune - CPU Purple Heart
 Noire - CPU Black Heart
 Blanc - CPU White Heart
 Vert - CPU Green Heart
 Plutia - CPU Iris Heart
 Uzume Tennouboshi - CPU Orange Heart
 Peashy - CPU Yellow Heart

Other
Aradia
Babalon

See also
 Lists of deities

References

Women-related lists
Goddesses